Steve Nelson Broussard (born February 22, 1967) is an American former professional football player who was a running back in the National Football League (NFL) for the Atlanta Falcons, Cincinnati Bengals, and Seattle Seahawks. He has also served as a former assistant coach for several college football teams.

College career
Born and raised in Los Angeles, and Altadena/Pasadena California, Broussard starred at Manual Arts High School and graduated in 1985. He played college football at Washington State in Pullman, and led the Pac-10 in receiving as a sophomore (1987) and rushing as a junior (1988). In his senior year in 1989, Broussard led the conference in all-purpose yards, was the MVP (offensive), and ranked ninth in the nation in rushing yards per game. He completed his college career ranked third on WSU's all-time rushing list, fifth on the career receiving list, and owned two of the top three single-season rushing marks. He was named to the Cougar Hall of Fame in 2015.

Professional career
Broussard was the 20th overall pick of the 1990 NFL Draft by the Atlanta Falcons.  He played four seasons for Atlanta (1990–1993), one in Cincinnati, then four more for the Seattle Seahawks (under head coach Dennis Erickson), and retired after the 1998 season.

NFL career statistics

Coaching career
After his nine-year NFL career, Broussard spent four years coaching high school football in California. He was the offensive coordinator at Don Lugo High School in Chino before going to Diamond Ranch High School as offensive coordinator in 2001.  He became head coach at Diamond Ranch in 2002 and coached until 2003. His first season as head coach resulted in success with the Diamond Ranch Panthers taking the Mt. Baldy League Title. For the 2003 season, the Diamond Ranch Panthers were the heavy favorites (ranked #1 in preseason Mt. Baldy League) to take the league title once again with several returning seniors on offense & defense, and a talented junior class that featured three division I prospects.  The Panthers finished 1–4 in Mt. Baldy League play for the 2003 season.

Prior to the 2004 season, Portland State head coach Tim Walsh hired Broussard as a running backs coach. During the 2004 season, Broussard coached a first team All-Big Sky fullback in Allen Kennett, while running backs Joe Rubin and Ryan Fuqua combined to lead the Vikings to a Big Sky Conference best rushing average of 204.4 yards per game. Broussard coached the receivers his last 2 years at PSU until he was hired by Washington State prior to the 2007 season.

On February 8, 2007, Washington State head coach Bill Doba announced that Broussard would be returning to WSU to serve as the Cougars' running backs coach and special teams coordinator.

In 2011, Broussard moved to Arizona State University to coach receivers under head coach Dennis Erickson. ASU ranked 10th in the nation in passing offense (316.7 yds/g) and receiver Gerell Robinson ranked ninth in the nation with 107. 5 receiving yards per game. During the 2010 season, Broussard's receiving corps ranked 15th in the nation (286.4) and totaled 279 receptions for 3,437 yards and 23 touchdowns.

In his first season with the UCLA Bruins in 2012, Broussard directed a running back group headed by senior Johnathan Franklin, who set new school season (1,734 yards) and career (4,403) rushing marks on his way to earning All-America honors. Franklin, a finalist for the Doak Walker Award, also set a school record with nine 100-yard rushing games in 2012 and established new marks for both career (4,925) and season (2,062) all-purpose yardage. He went on to be selected by the Green Bay Packers in the 2013 NFL Draft.

In his second season with the Bruins, Broussard directed a running back group headed by Myles Jack, who won Pac-12 Freshman of the Year honors in 2013. Jack set a UCLA single game scoring record with four touchdowns in the win over Washington on November 15.

Broussard reconnected with SMU head coach June Jones, the coach that had a part in drafting him in Atlanta, on the Mustangs where he coached the running backs for one season in 2014. During the 2015 season, Broussard was the offensive coordinator at Pasadena City College.

In April 2017, Broussard was hired as the new head coach at Fort Vancouver High School in Vancouver, Washington. In February 2018, Broussard was reported to be taking the head football coaching job at St. Monica Catholic High School in California. He now coaches for Union High School in Camas, Washington.

References

External links
 

1967 births
Living people
American football return specialists
American football running backs
Atlanta Falcons players
Cincinnati Bengals players
Portland State Vikings football coaches
Seattle Seahawks players
Washington State Cougars football coaches
Washington State Cougars football players
Players of American football from Los Angeles
Sports coaches from Los Angeles
Ed Block Courage Award recipients